Heanor railway station was a former railway station at Heanor in Derbyshire, opened in 1891. It was the terminus of the branch from Ilkeston on the Great Northern Railway Derbyshire Extension line.

It was one of two stations called "Heanor". The other had been opened by the Midland Railway the year before. It was not until 1950 that British Railways renamed them Heanor North and Heanor South. Unofficially, the station was known locally as 'Heanor Gate' to separate it from the other Heanor station before they were both officially renamed.

The GNR station closed to passenger services in 1939 and for goods in 1963. The last stationmaster was H.H. Voss, also a Derbyshire County Council Alderman who retired after 44 years service on the railway locally in October 1963.

References

 
 
 

Disused railway stations in Derbyshire
Former Great Northern Railway stations
Railway stations in Great Britain opened in 1891
Railway stations in Great Britain closed in 1939